Mark Hulstrøm (born 28 December 1965) is a Danish boxer. He competed in the men's heavyweight event at the 1992 Summer Olympics. 
He has been the headcoach for almost three decades in Korsør Amateur Boxing Club, and made several Danish champions over the years. A big asset for amateurboxing in Denmark.
Mark had 20 professional boxing fights, with 16 wins of which 9 were won by knockout.

References

External links
 

1965 births
Living people
Danish male boxers
Olympic boxers of Denmark
Boxers at the 1992 Summer Olympics
Boxers from Greater London
Heavyweight boxers